Kalinovka is a rural locality (a selo) in Mukhorshibirsky District, Republic of Buryatia, Russia. The population was 410 as of 2010. There are 3 streets.

Geography 
Kalinovka is located 55 km north of Mukhorshibir (the district's administrative centre) by road. Galtay is the nearest rural locality.

References 

Rural localities in Mukhorshibirsky District